The County sheriff (Florida) is a Florida constitutional officer and a part of the state judicial branch.

The Sheriff has a duty to enforce both the Florida Constitution and Florida state laws and statutes, and to provide for the security, safety and well-being of its citizens. This is accomplished through the delivery of law enforcement services, the operation of the County Jail, and the provision of court security. The Office of the Sheriff functions as the Executive Officer of the court.

Under Florida law, The Sheriff derives his legal authority from the Constitution of the State of Florida. The Sheriff is vested with the ability to appoint and direct deputies who will act in his name and office to enforce the appropriate and applicable laws of the State of Florida. Those deputies of the County Sheriff's Office who are Certified Law Enforcement officers must maintain a thorough working knowledge of the laws they enforce and the underlying principals from which they emanate.

Duties

The duties, as enumerated in Chapter 30 of the Florida Statutes, include:
Executing all process of the Supreme Court, circuit court, county court, and board of county commissioners, to be executed in its county.
Executing such other writs, processes, warrants, and other papers directed to it, as may come to its hands to be executed in its county.
Attending all terms of the circuit court and county court held in its county.
Executing all orders of the board of county commissioners of its county, for which services it shall receive such compensation, out of the county treasury, as said boards may deem proper.
Being conservator of the peace in its county.
Suppressing tumults, riots, and unlawful assemblies in its county with force and strong hand when necessary.
Apprehending, without warrant, any person disturbing the peace, and carrying that person before the proper judicial officer, that further proceedings may be had against him or her according to law.
Having authority to raise the power of the county and command any person to assist it, when necessary, in the execution of the duties of its office.
Being, ex officio, timber agents for its county.
Performing such other duties as may be imposed upon it by law.

See also
 Sheriffs in the United States

Notes

Government of Florida